Aqbolagh (also Romanized as Āqbolāgh; also known as Āq Balāq) is a village in Emamzadeh Hamzehali Rural District, Boldaji District, Borujen County, Chaharmahal and Bakhtiari Province, Iran. At the 2006 census, its population was 684, in 169 families. The village is populated by Turkic people.

References 

Populated places in Borujen County